The Boy Scouts of Bahrain is the national Scouting organization of Bahrain. It was founded in 1953, and became a member of the World Organization of the Scout Movement in 1970.  The Boy Scouts of Bahrain has 2,301 members as of 2011.

The small Bahraini Scout organization often participates in cooperative events with neighboring Kuwait and Qatar. Scouts are involved in community service such as cleaning polluted areas and spraying insecticides, giving blood and helping to organize blood donor services, assistance at sports events and taking charge of first aid at schools.

Program and sections

Al-Ashbal (Cub Scouts)-8 to 12
Al-fetian (Boy Scouts)-12 to 14
Al-Matakadem (Rovers)-14 to 18
There is also a section for handicapped Scouts.

The Scout Motto is Kun Musta'idan or كن مستعداً, translating as Be Prepared in Arabic. The noun for a single Scout is Kashaf or كشاف in Arabic.

See also
The Girl Guides Association of Bahrain

References

External links
 Official website

1953 establishments in Bahrain
World Organization of the Scout Movement member organizations
Scouting and Guiding in Bahrain
Youth organizations established in 1953